Srednji Vrh may refer to: 

Settlements in Slovenia:
 Srednji Vrh, Kranjska Gora
 Srednji Vrh, Dobrova–Polhov Gradec

Mountains in Slovenia:
 Srednji vrh (2134 m), a peak in the Krn Range of the Julian Alps
 Srednji vrh (1853 m), a peak in the Kamnik–Savinja Alps
 Srednji vrh (1796 m), a peak in the Karawanks